Sunrise Senior Living is an American operator of senior living communities. As of 2022, it operates over more than 270 assisted living facilities throughout the United States and Canada making it the sixth-largest senior living provider in the U.S.

Overview
Headquartered in McLean, Virginia, in the Washington, DC metropolitan area, the company employs approximately 22,000 people. Sunrise offers senior living services, including independent living, assisted living, care for individuals with Alzheimer's disease and other forms of memory loss, as well as respite care and short-terms stays.

In May 2020, Sunrise came under fire for not providing testing for COVID-19 at their Scottsdale, Arizona location, despite the fact that at least one person at the facility was confirmed positive for the virus.

Sunrise, in the United States, states that it allows new residents to bring a pet cat or dog with them, and that almost every Sunrise facility also has a community cat or dog in residence.

History 
The first Sunrise community was opened in 1981 in Oakton, Virginia, by founders Paul and Terry Klaassen. In February, Jack R. Callison, Jr. was named Sunrise’s chief executive officer (CEO).

In December 2021, Sunrise Senior Living opened Sunrise on East 56th, a 151-unit luxury lifestyle community in New York City. The building earned LEED Silver for sustainability and leadership, WELL Certification (silver) for quality building air, water, light, nourishment, fitness, comfort, and mind and WELL Health-Safety Rating Seal for clearing practices and air and water quality. Sunrise at East 56th is the only building in the senior living industry to have all three certifications.

United Kingdom
In 2021, the company announced that following a comprehensive strategic review, the company would exit as manager of its UK portfolio.

References

Housing for the elderly in the United States
Companies based in McLean, Virginia
Housing for the elderly in the United Kingdom
American companies established in 1981
1981 establishments in Virginia
Elderly care